"The Creator" is a science fiction novelette by American writer Clifford D. Simak.  It was published in book form in 1946 by Crawford Publications in an edition of 500 copies.  It had previously appeared in the September 1935 issue of the magazine Marvel Tales.

Plot introduction
The novelette suggests that our universe was not created by God.

Sources

External links

1935 American novels
American science fiction novels
Novels first published in serial form
Novels by Clifford D. Simak
Works originally published in American magazines
Works originally published in science fiction magazines
Novelettes